Holy Trinity Church, South Kensington, is an Anglican church located on Prince Consort Road in the City of Westminster, London, England. The current building dates from 1901 and was built by George Frederick Bodley and Cecil Greenwood Hare.

Edward Ashmore and Gilbert Spencer were both married in the church.

External links

Official website
Deanery of Westminster St Margaret

South Kensington
Grade I listed churches in the City of Westminster
Diocese of London
South Kensington
George Frederick Bodley church buildings